The 1994 Harrow Council election took place on 5 May 1994 to elect members of Harrow London Borough Council in London, England. The whole council was up for election and the council went in no overall control.

Background

Election result

Ward results

References

1994
1994 London Borough council elections